Mohammadshahr (also Romanized as Moḩammadshahr; formerly Moḩammadīyeh) is a city in the Central District of Khusf County, South Khorasan province, Iran. At the 2006 census, its population was 117 in 29 households, when it was a village in the former Khusf District of Birjand County. The following census in 2011 counted 1,707 people in 43 households; the village had been elevated to the status of a city.

The latest census in 2016 showed a population of 3,590 people in 46 households, by which time the district had been separated from the county and Khusf County established with two new districts..

References 

Khusf County

Cities in South Khorasan Province

Populated places in South Khorasan Province

Populated places in Khusf County